Skoda Xanthi are a Greek football club which are based in Xanthi. During the 2013/14 campaign they will be competing in the following competitions Greek Super League, Greek Cup, Uefa Europa League.

Greek Super League

League table

Matches

References

Xanthi F.C. seasons
Skoda Xanthi F.C.